The Underground is a sketch comedy series produced by and starring Damon Wayans. It aired on Showtime. Wayans describes the show as "In Living Color on steroids." The show features raunchy behavior and as Wayans states in his opening monologue, "We decided to test the limits."

The description of the show information is "The future of comedy is here in Damon Wayan's hilarious and uninhibited comedy sketch show where no topic or taboo goes unturned."

References

External links 
 

2006 American television series debuts
2006 American television series endings
2000s American sketch comedy television series
2000s American variety television series
Showtime (TV network) original programming
English-language television shows